Jean-Charles Tardieu, also called "Tardieu-Cochin" (3 September 1765 – 3 April 1830) was a successful French painter during the ages of Napoleon 
and of the Bourbon Restoration.  His work was primarily historical, but also included landscapes, portraits and religious subjects.

Biography

Jean-Charles Tardieu was born on 3 September 1765 in Paris, son of Jacques-Nicolas Tardieu and Elisabeth Claire Tournay.
His father and his grandfather, Nicolas-Henri Tardieu, were both members of the Academy and the King's engravers.
His father's cousin was the engraver Charles-Nicolas Cochin, who left him a small legacy when he died in 1790. 
Cochin also treated him as a sort of pupil and gave him advice.  
He was formally placed under Jean-Baptiste Regnault for his artistic training.
He failed to get the Grand Prix de Rome, but the second prize of the Prix de Rome was awarded to him in 1790. 
His father died on 9 July 1791.

A passionate artist with great skill in composition, Tardieu exhibited in various salons, and achieved considerable success.
He took part in a number of exhibitions in the Louvre between 1806 and 1823.
In 1808 he was granted a housing allowance.
The great majority of his works were bought by the government or commissioned by the government.

Tardieu had excellent connections and seems to have been fully employed during the reigns of Napoleon, Louis XVIII and Charles X of France. 
Several of his works were bought for the house of the latter sovereign.
He made a large number of tableaux for the government, which were placed in the Luxembourg, Versailles, Saint-Cloud, Fontainebleau and Compiègne palaces and also at the Musée des Beaux-Arts de Rouen, Musée des Beaux-Arts et d'archéologie de Besançon, Rouen Cathedral, Nîmes Cathedral and Lons-le-Saulnier Cathedral.

In his later years, Tardieu worked on religious tableaux and landscapes.
Tardieu died in Paris on 3 April 1830.
His son Jules-Romain Tardieu was born in Rouen on 28 January 1805. 
Jules was to become a connoisseur of the arts and letters, a writer, publisher and bookseller, and a member of the Academy of Caen.

Œuvres

Tardieu-Cochin's work was primarily historical.
He often took classical and poetic subjects. 
He also made copies of several paintings of saints by Philippe de Champaigne that were commissioned by the king's house.
Almost all his works are held in public collections including, among others, those in the Rouen Cathedral, and in the museums of Besançon, Le Havre, Marseille and Versailles. 
Among the most successful are Halte en Égypte, Jean Bart à la cour, la Conversion du duc de Joyeuse, Frédéric-Guillaume chez le grand Frédéric, Louis XVIII à Mittau et l’Aveugle au marché des Innocents.

Paintings 

Some of the more notable of Tardieu's paintings:

Other notable works include:
 Ulysse reconnu par Euryclée, Marseille, Musée des beaux-arts de Marseille
 Agamède et Trophonius
 Jésus-Christ chez Marthe et Marie
 Première messe de saint Vincent de Paul 
 Un veuf au tombeau de fa femme
 Les Bacchanales
In addition, public collections hold the following:
 Bienfaisance de Napoleon 1er envers Marocwi, vieillard polonais de 117 ans qui lui est présenté, Palace of Versailles
 Halte d’Henri IV en forêt après la bataille d’Ivry, 1802 ou 1807, Pau, Pyrénées-Atlantiques, Château de Pau
 Halte d’Henri IV en forêt, Pau, Musée national du château de Pau
 Henri IV devant Paris. Aout 1590, Versailles
 Henri IV fait distribuer des vivres pendant le siège de Paris en aout 1590, Versailles
 La Clémence de Louis XII en avril 1498, Versailles
 La Justification de Suzanne, Toulouse, Musée des Augustins;
 Le roi Louis XVIII en exil à Mittau y couronne la rosière, 1799, Versailles
 Sully aux pieds d’Henri IV, Pau, Musée national du château de Pau
 Trophenius et Agamède, Besançon Museum

Gallery

References
Citations

Sources

Landscape artists
French portrait painters
18th-century French painters
French male painters
19th-century French painters
1765 births
1830 deaths
19th-century French male artists
18th-century French male artists